The Amazing Race 12 is the twelfth season of American reality television show The Amazing Race. It featured eleven teams of two competing in a race around the world.

The season premiered on CBS on November 4, 2007, and the finale aired on January 20, 2008.

Newly dating couple TK Erwin and Rachel Rosales were the winners of this season, while father and daughter Ronald and Christina Hsu finished in second place, and grandson and grandfather Nicolas Fulks and Donald Jerousek finished in third.

Production

Development and filming

In May 2007, CBS confirmed The Amazing Race was picked up for a twelfth season. It was originally to be scheduled in the mid-season of the 2007–08 TV season. However, when Viva Laughlin was canceled in October, The Amazing Race 12 debuted early to take the time slot.

The Amazing Race 12 spanned  in 21 days. The season covered four continents, visiting ten countries (five of which were not previously visited by the series), while traveling entirely in the Northern Hemisphere. The newly visited countries were Ireland, Burkina Faso, Lithuania, Croatia, and Taiwan. The shortened filming schedule was initially attributed, in part, to the removal of non-elimination legs, which would have been a first on The Amazing Race. However, host Phil Keoghan told Kynt & Vyxsin in Leg 7 that there were two non-elimination legs this season.

It was also noted that the production of this season ran into the production of The Amazing Race Asia 2 in an unspecified airport.

This season introduced two new twists to The Amazing Race: the U-Turn and the Speed Bump. Positioned just after a Detour, the U-Turn allowed one team to force another team behind them to complete both sides of the Detour. The Speed Bump was a penalty task for a team that finished last in a non-elimination leg, and had to be completed during the next leg in addition to other tasks. The U-Turn and the Speed Bump each occurred in two episodes of The Amazing Race 12.

Marketing
Two days after the series premiere, CBS launched an Amazing Race page on social networking site Facebook via Facebook Ads. The site contained interactive contents such as maps, trivia, a travel log, and prizes. The site also included a tie-in with the Where I've Been application.

Cast 
This season's eleven teams included married lesbian ministers, dating Goths, and siblings. Executive producer Bertram van Munster felt that "it was not intentional" for casting to leave out young-male teams commonly found in past seasons. He also said that it was pure coincidence for 15 of 22 racers to be residents of California.

During The Amazing Race: Unfinished Business, Christina Hsu revealed that she was engaged to Azaria Azene. They married in March 2011.

Future appearances
After the season ended, Kynt & Vyxsin applied for third season of The Amazing Race Asia, but were turned down by producer Michael McKay due to their prior Amazing Race experience. Their audition was shown on the "Racers Revealed" episode of the season. Kynt & Vyxsin and Ronald & Christina competed again on The Amazing Race: Unfinished Business, with Kynt having changed his name to Kent.

Results
The following teams are listed with their placements in each leg. Placements are listed in finishing order. 
A  placement with a dagger indicates that the team was eliminated. 
An  placement with a double-dagger indicates that the team was the last to arrive at a pit stop in a non-elimination leg, and had to perform a Speed Bump task in the following leg. 
A  indicates that the team won the Fast Forward. 
A  indicates that the team used the U-Turn; a  indicates the team on the receiving end of the U-Turn.

Notes

Race summary

Leg 1 (United States → Ireland)

Episode 1: "Donkeys Have Souls Too" (November 4, 2007)
Prize: A trip for two to the Banff Springs Hotel in Alberta, Canada (awarded to Azaria & Hendekea)
Eliminated: Ari & Staella
Locations
Los Angeles, California (Playboy Mansion) (Starting Line)
 Los Angeles → Shannon, Ireland
 Rossaveal → Cill Rónáin, Inishmore
Inishmore (Teampall Bheanáin – The Pier House)
 Cill Rónáin → Rossaveal
 Cleggan (Cleggan Farm) 
Clifden (Connemara Heritage and History Centre) 
Episode summary
Teams set off from the Playboy Mansion in Los Angeles, California, and made their way to Los Angeles International Airport, where they had to book one of two flights to Shannon, Ireland. Five teams were booked on a British Airways flight scheduled to arrive 45 minutes earlier than an Aer Lingus flight that carried the remaining six teams. However, the British Airways flight was delayed during its connection in London, allowing the Aer Lingus flight to arrive in Shannon first.
Once in Shannon, teams had to travel by ferry to the island of Inishmore and find the Teampall Bheanáin. At the church, teams had to sign up for one of three ferries departing the next morning. After returning to the Irish mainland, teams had to drive themselves to Cleggan Farm and then pedal a tandem bicycle along a dirt path to their next clue.
After completing the Roadblock, teams had to choose a donkey, fill each of its baskets with 15 pieces of peat, and then walk the donkey back to the entrance of the farm in order to receive their next clue, which directed them to the pit stop: the Connemara Heritage and History Centre in Clifden.

Leg 2 (Ireland → Netherlands)

Episode 2: "I've Become the Archie Bunker of the Home" (November 11, 2007)
Prize: A sport bike for each racer (awarded to Lorena & Jason)
Eliminated: Kate & Pat
Locations
Clifden (Connemara Heritage and History Centre) 
 Shannon → Amsterdam, Netherlands
 Amsterdam (Amsterdam Centraal Station) 
Amsterdam (Melkmeisjesbrug) 
 Amsterdam → Ransdorp (Rural Field) 
 Durgerdam (Durgerdam Yacht Club) 
Episode summary
At the beginning of this leg, teams were instructed to fly to Amsterdam, Netherlands. Once in Amsterdam, teams had to travel by train to the Amsterdam Centraal Station and then search for their next clue on the Melkmeisjesbrug.
 This season's first Detour was a choice between Hoist It or Hunt It. In Hoist It, teams had to use a traditional rope-and-pulley system to hoist five pieces of furniture up to an apartment in order to receive their next clue. In Hunt It, teams had to travel on foot several blocks to the Fietsflat bicycle parking lot and search through thousands of bicycles for two tagged with the specific color designated in their clue. After finding their bicycles, teams had to ride them  to an attendant, who gave them their next clue.
After completing the Detour, teams had to travel by bus to a marked field in Ransdorp, where they found their next clue.
 In this leg's Roadblock, one team member had to play a sport called fierljeppen, which involved completing a  vault across an irrigation ditch and landing on both feet in the marshy grass. Once they completed the vault correctly, they could pick up their clue and vault back to their partner.
After the Roadblock, teams had to ride cargo bikes known as a bakfiets to the pit stop at the Yacht Club in Durgerdam.
Additional notes
The fierljeppen task was later revisited in season 21 as a Switchback.

Leg 3 (Netherlands → Burkina Faso)

Episode 3: "Please, Lord, Give Me Milk" (November 18, 2007)
Prize: A vacation to Bermuda (awarded to Azaria & Hendekea)
Eliminated: Marianna & Julia
Locations
Durgerdam (Durgerdam Yacht Club) 
 Amsterdam → Ouagadougou, Burkina Faso
 Ouagadougou → Bingo 
Bingo (Village School) 
Bingo (Village Outskirts) 
Episode summary
At the beginning of this leg, teams were only told to fly to Ouagadougou, and they had to figure out that it was the capital of Burkina Faso. Once there, teams had to travel by taxi to the train station, where they found their next clue. Teams were directed to travel by train to Bingo and listen for their stop, as the town of Bingo did not have an actual station. After disembarking, teams had to search nearby for their next clue.
 In this leg's Roadblock, one team member had to milk a camel and collect the milk in a dried gourd. Once they had enough milk, they had to drink the milk in order to receive their next clue. If team members were unable to obtain enough milk from their chosen camel, they had to wait until everyone who could complete the task had left before switching camels.
After completing the Roadblock, teams had to lead four camels along a marked path to a group of nomads, where they found their next clue.
 This leg's Detour was a choice between Teach It or Learn It. In Teach It, teams had to teach a schoolchild, who did not speak English, ten English words. When a local teacher was satisfied that the child could recite the words, teams received their next clue. In Learn It, teams had to learn ten words in the local Moré language from a schoolchild and then recite the words in a test to a local teacher in order to receive their next clue.
After completing the Detour, teams had to follow a marked path to the outskirts of Bingo and find the pit stop.

Leg 4 (Burkina Faso)

Episode 4: "Let's Name Our Chicken Phil" (November 25, 2007)
Prize: A Yamaha Motor Scooter for each racer (awarded to Azaria & Hendekea)
Eliminated: Lorena & Jason
Locations
Bingo (Village Outskirts) 
Bingo (Village)
Yako (Village Field) 
Yako (Pelegtanga Market) 
Ouagadougou (Tampouy Goat Market)  
Ouagadougou (Hôtel de Ville) 
Episode summary
At the beginning of this leg, teams had to follow a marked path to a tribal chief, who gave them their next clue, as well as a chicken that they had to carry with them throughout the entire leg. Teams then had to make their way to a field in Yako, where they found their next clue.
 This leg's Detour was a choice between Shake Your Pans or Shake Your Booty. In Shake Your Booty, teams had to learn a traditional local dance and perform it with Winiama masked dancers for a crowd of locals. Teams only had one attempt, and if the three judges felt that a team lacked creativity or had a bad performance, they incurred a 10-minute penalty. After successfully performing the dance or waiting out the penalty, teams received their next clue.
After completing the Detour, teams had to travel along a marked path to the Pelegtanga Market in order to find their next clue.
 In this leg's Roadblock, one team member had to load a large amount of cumbersome goods, including a small goat, onto a bicycle and then deliver the goods to a nearby market in order to receive their next clue.
Teams had to check in at the pit stop: the Hôtel de Ville in Ouagadougou.
Additional notes
 Shana & Jennifer chose to use the U-Turn on Lorena & Jason.

Leg 5 (Burkina Faso → Lithuania)

Episode 5: "We Really Burned Bridges, For Sure" (December 2, 2007)
Prize: A trip for two to Japan (awarded to TK & Rachel)
Eliminated: Shana & Jennifer
Locations
Ouagadougou (Hôtel de Ville) 
 Ouagadougou → Vilnius, Lithuania
Vilnius (Trakai Island Castle) (Unaired)
Vilnius (St. Anne's Church)
Vilnius (Old Town – Narutis Courtyard, Vilnius University Courtyard & Several Locations) 
Rumšiškės (Lithuanian Open Air Museum – Dzūkija Village) 
Rumšiškės (Lithuanian Open Air Museum – Račkiškės Chapel ) 
Rumšiškės (Lithuanian Open Air Museum – Aukštaitija Windmill) 
Episode summary
At the beginning of this leg, teams were instructed to fly to Vilnius, Lithuania. Once in Vilnius, teams had to drive to St. Anne's Church in order to find their next clue.
 In this leg's Roadblock, one team member had to choose a local Lithuanian woman working in the Narutis courtyard, who gave them a basket and told them whom to take it to the Vilnius University Courtyard. After traveling on foot through the confusing streets of the Vilnius Old Town and delivering their basket, they were then handed a book and one of four final destinations: Gabi Kavine, Saint Germain Restaurant, Hair Salon Sidabrynas, or the Shakespeare Hotel. When the delivery was made to the correct location, they received their next clue.
After completing the Roadblock, teams had to make their way to the Lithuanian Open Air Museum, where they had to search through the village for a Travelocity Roaming Gnome, as depicted in a picture in their clue, hidden among 100 common Lithuanian gnomes. When teams found the correct gnome, they had to follow a marked path to their next clue box at a chapel. Teams had to carry their gnome with them for the remainder of this leg.
 This leg's Detour at a traditional Midsummer's Festival was a choice between Count Down or Step Up. In Count Down, teams had to correctly count a marked section of picket fence and give their count to a villager in order to receive their next clue. In Step Up, both team members had to walk on stilts along a marked course to the finish line without falling in order to receive their next clue.
Teams had to check in at the pit stop: the Aukštaitija Windmill in Rumšiškės.
Additional notes
Teams had to book tickets at an official airline ticketing office before being allowed to enter Ouagadougou Airport.
After arriving in Vilnius, teams actually had to drive themselves to Trakai Island Castle in order to find their next clue, which directed them to St. Anne's Church. This task was unaired, and teams were shown driving to St. Anne's Church directly after arriving in Vilnius.

Leg 6 (Lithuania → Croatia)

Episode 6: "Cherry on Top of the Sundae That's Already Melted" (December 9, 2007)
Prize: A catamaran for each racer (awarded to Ronald & Christina)
Eliminated: Azaria & Hendekea
Locations
Rumšiškės (Lithuanian Open Air Museum – Aukštaitija Windmill) 
 Vilnius → Dubrovnik, Croatia
Dubrovnik (Fort of St. Lawrence) 
Dubrovnik (Walls of Dubrovnik – Fort Bokar) 
Dubrovnik (Trg Oružja)
Dubrovnik (Fort Imperial – Stone Cross) 
Episode summary
At the beginning of this leg, teams were instructed to fly to Dubrovnik, Croatia. Once there, teams had to travel to the base of the Fort of St. Lawrence in order to find their next clue.
 In this leg's Roadblock, one team member had to find one of eight stones out of 150 that could fit into the rock wall at the fort being rebuilt from the Croatian War of Independence in order to receive their next clue.
After completing the Roadblock, teams had to go to the Fort of St. Lawrence's roof and ride a zip-line down to Fort Bokar in order to receive their next clue.
 This leg's Detour was a choice between Short & Long or Long & Short. In Short & Long, teams had to rappel down the walls of Fort Bokar and follow a marked path to a wall, where they had to finish assembling a rope ladder that they could use to scale the wall. They then had to make their way on foot a long distance through the confusing old-quarter streets to Trg Oružja in order to find their next clue. In Long & Short, teams had to tandem zip-line from the fort, swim to a floating platform, and then row a fishing boat around the city walls to a flagged harbor. They then had to make their way on foot a short distance to Trg Oružja in order to find their next clue.
Teams had to check in at the pit stop: Fort Imperial in Dubrovnik.

Leg 7 (Croatia → Italy)

Episode 7: "This is Forever, Now" (December 23, 2007)
Prize: A trip for two to Cancún, Mexico (awarded to Nicolas & Donald) 
Locations
Dubrovnik (Fort Imperial – Stone Cross) 
 Dubrovnik → Split
 Split to Ancona, Italy
Empoli (Campo di Volo Silvano Poli) 
Empoli (Fabio Studio) 
Vinci (Da Vinci Birthplace ) 
Vinci (Da Vinci Birthplace  Piazza Guido Masi) 
Florence (Boboli Gardens) 
Episode summary
At the beginning of this leg, teams were instructed to travel by bus to Split, and then by ferry to Ancona, Italy, where they found their next clue. Teams had to drive to the Campo di Volo Silvano Poli in Empoli, where they found their next clue. Teams also received a BlackBerry, which they could use to receive a message from their loved ones at home.
 In this leg's Roadblock, one team member had to fly over Tuscany in an ultralight and scan a  radius of the countryside for the name of their next destination: Vinci. If team members thought they spotted the word, they had to signal their pilot to land. Once on the ground, they had to tell the instructor the word, and if they were correct, he handed them their next clue. There was a thirty-minute time limit per flight, after which the ultralight had to land for refueling.
 In this season's only Fast Forward, one team had to travel to Fabio Studio and have a permanent tattoo inked onto their arms: the letters ƒƒ. Nicolas & Donald won the Fast Forward.
After completing the Roadblock, teams had to drive to Vinci and find their next clue outside the birthplace of Leonardo da Vinci.
 This leg's Detour was a choice between Invention or Tradition. In Invention, teams traveled to a nearby courtyard and chose a replica of a centuries-old crane designed by Leonardo da Vinci. They then had to place a mirror underneath in order to read the clue printed on the bottom of the stone. In Tradition, teams traveled to the Piazza Guido Masi, where they had to learn and correctly perform a traditional local flag throwing routine in order to receive a flag displaying the name of their next destination.
Teams had to check in at the pit stop: the Boboli Gardens in Florence.
Additional notes
This was a non-elimination leg.

Leg 8 (Italy → India)

Episode 8: "Honestly, They Have Witch Powers or Something!" (December 30, 2007)
Prize: A trip for two to Saint Martin (awarded to TK & Rachel)
Eliminated: Kynt & Vyxsin
Locations
Florence (Boboli Gardens) 
 Florence → Mumbai, India
Mumbai (Khar Danda – M.R. Naik Newspaper Stall)
Mumbai (Chauhan Alteration Tailors)
Mumbai (Dariya Mahal) 
Mumbai (Dadar West Bridge  Dadar Flower Market) 
Mumbai (Kabutar Khana) 
Mumbai (Colaba – Bharatgas Colaba Gas Service) 
Mumbai (Bandra – Bandra Fort) 
Episode summary
At the beginning of this leg, teams were instructed to fly to Mumbai, India. Once in Mumabi, teams had to find the M.R. Naik Newspaper Stall and then had search for an advertisement in The Times of India, which instructed them to travel by auto rickshaw to Chauhan Alteration Tailors in order to receive their next clue.
 For their Speed Bump, Kynt & Vyxsin had to find the yoga master at Dariya Mahal and successfully perform a series of yoga poses before they could continue racing.
 This leg's Detour was a choice between Paste 'Em or Thread 'Em. In Paste 'Em, teams had to travel to a marked underpass beneath the Dadar West Bridge and use provided supplies to properly paste a six-panel Bollywood movie poster onto the wall in order to receive their next clue. In Thread 'Em, teams had to travel to the Dadar Flower Market, find a marked flower stall, and create a traditional wedding garland by threading 108 flowers in an particular pattern. When the judge approved the garland, teams had to deliver it to a nearby bridegroom, who gave them their next clue.
After completing the Detour, teams had to travel to Kabutar Khana, where they found their next clue.
 In this leg's Roadblock, one team member had to load a bicycle cart with six tanks of propane gas, pedal to two addresses listed on their order slips, deliver three tanks to each address, and collect receipts as proof of delivery. Once their deliveries were complete, they had to hand their two order slips and receipts to the foreman in order to receive their next clue.
Teams had to check in at the pit stop: the Bandra Fort in Mumbai.
Additional notes
 Kynt & Vyxsin attempted to use the U-Turn on Nicolas & Donald; however, Nicolas & Donald had already passed the U-Turn by this point and were therefore unaffected.

Leg 9 (India → Japan)

Episode 9: "I Just Hope He Doesn't Croak on Us" (January 6, 2008)
Prize: An electric car for each racer (awarded to Ronald & Christina)
Locations
Mumbai (Bandra – Bandra Fort) 
 Mumbai → Osaka, Japan
Kishiwada (Kishiwada Castle)
Osaka (JR Noda Station & Osaka Central Post Office) 
Osaka (Kita-Mido Temple )
Osaka (Shimojima Building  Saera Flower Shop) 
Osaka (Tempozan Park) 
Episode summary
At the beginning of this leg, teams were instructed to fly to Osaka, Japan. Once in Osaka, teams had to travel to Kishiwada Castle and search the grounds for their next clue, which directed teams to the Noda Station. There, teams had to locate a janitor inside the terminal, who handed them their next clue.
 In this leg's Roadblock, one team member had to drive a Japanese couple  through a maze of confusing one-way streets to a specified address: the Osaka Central Post Office. They could stop and ask for directions, but could not invite a local to lead them or join them in the car, nor could the couple help them. Once they arrived at the post office, the couple handed them their next clue; however, they had to return to their teammate before they could read the clue.
After completing the Roadblock, teams had to travel by taxi to Kita-Mido Temple in order to find their next clue.
 This leg's Detour was a choice between Sense of Touch or Sense of Smell. In Sense of Touch, teams traveled on foot to the Shimojima Building and had to use miniature robots, controlled by cell phones, to play a game of soccer against two robotic defenders. Once each team member scored a goal, the referee gave them their next clue. In Sense of Smell, teams traveled on foot to the Saera Flower Shop, which only sold artificial flowers. Once there, they had to use only their noses to find one real flower, hidden amongst thousands of artificial flowers, in order to receive their next clue.
Teams had to check in at the pit stop: Tempozan Park in Osaka.
Additional notes
This was a non-elimination leg.

Leg 10 (Japan → Taiwan)

Episode 10: "Sorry, Guys, I'm Not Happy to See You" (January 13, 2008)
Prize: A five-night vacation to Curaçao (awarded to Ronald & Christina)
Eliminated: Nathan & Jennifer
Locations
Osaka (Tempozan Park) 
Osaka (Umeda Sky Building – Floating Garden)
 Osaka → Taipei, Taiwan
 Taipei → Taichung
Jiji (Acrobatics Jeep) 
Jiji (Heping Elementary School) 
 Taichung → Taipei
Taipei (GK Teahouse)
Taipei (Gong Guan Night Market)
Taipei (Youth Park ) 
Taipei (Chiang Kai-shek Memorial Hall) 
Episode summary
At the beginning of this leg, teams had to make their way to the Umeda Sky Building, where they had to take an elevator to the Floating Garden and search for their next clue. They were then instructed to fly to Taipei, Taiwan. Once in Taipei, teams had to travel by train and taxi to Acrobatics Jeep in Jiji in order to find their next clue.
Afterwards, they switched to an amphibious car, donned a pair of goggles, and had to hold their breath while they were driven underwater for seventeen seconds before receiving their next clue.
 For their Speed Bump, TK & Rachel had to find Heping Elementary School, don protective gear, run through a barrage of fireworks, and then get doused with water before they could continue racing.
After completing the Roadblock, teams had to travel by train back to Taipei and find the GK Teahouse. There, each team member had to drink a cup of tea in order to find their next clue written in Chinese on the bottom of the teacup. Teams were directed to the Gong Guan Night Market, where they searched for a clown who gave them their next clue.
 This leg's Detour was a choice between Fire or Earth. In Fire, teams would have traveled to Zhongzheng Park to participate in a mystical Chinese ritual by writing messages of luck on Kongming lanterns. Once a team had sent twenty lanterns into the air, they would have received their next clue. In Earth, teams traveled to Youth Park, where they had to walk barefoot down a  path made of jagged stones, turn around, and then walk back to the start in order to receive their next clue. All teams chose to walk along the jagged stone path.
Teams had to check in at the pit stop: Chiang Kai-shek Memorial Hall in Taipei.

Leg 11 (Taiwan → United States)

Episode 11: "The Final Push" (January 20, 2008)
Winners: TK & Rachel
Second Place: Ronald & Christina
Third Place: Nicolas & Donald
Locations
Taipei (Chiang Kai-shek Memorial Hall) 
 Taipei → Anchorage, Alaska
Anchorage (6th Avenue Outfitters)
Anchorage (Ship Creek Boat Launch) 
 Anchorage (Twentymile River → Twenty-Mile Glacier)
 Anchorage (Twenty-Mile Glacier → Merrill Field)
Anchorage (Goose Lake Park) 
Anchorage (Resolution Park – Captain Cook Statue)
Anchorage (Alaska Center for the Performing Arts – Salmon Hooker Statue)
Girdwood (Girdwood Airport) 
Episode summary
At the beginning of this leg, teams were instructed to fly to Anchorage, Alaska. Once in Anchorage, teams had to find 6th Avenue Outfitters, where they picked up the gear they would need for this leg along with their next clue. They then traveled to the Ship Creek Boat Launch, where they found their next clue.
 This season's final Detour was a choice between Cut the Cod or Grab the Crab. In Cut the Cod, teams had to cut through several  lingcod and search for a miniature clue hidden inside one of the fish. In Grab the Crab, teams had to jump into the hold of a boat swarming with over 500 live crabs. They then had to search through the crabs for one marked with Amazing Race colors in order to receive their next clue.
After completing the Detour, teams traveled to the Twentymile River, where they took a high-speed boat to the Twenty-Mile Glacier. Once there, both team members had to climb a wall of ice in order to reach their next clue. Teams were instructed to travel via helicopter to Merrill Field and then by taxi to Goose Lake Park in order to find their next clue.
 In this season's final Roadblock, one team member found a field of objects that they had encountered along the racecourse. They had to match 10 of 15 recognizable items to their respective legs, but the combination of items had to meet the following requirements. Only one combination of items satisfied the conditions and opened the clue box, allowing racers to retrieve their next clue.
Three items had to be animals or animal byproducts.
One had to be a U-Turn.
Two had to be items either at or brought to a pit stop.
Two had to be items of transportation with wheels, one of which was used at a Detour.
One had to be an item of transportation resembling the shape of a stick.
{| class="wikitable unsortable" style="text-align:center;"
! scope="col" | Leg
! scope="col" | Country
! scope="col" | Objects
|-
! scope="row" |1
| Ireland
| Tandem Bicycle
|- 
! scope="row" |2
| Netherlands
| Bicycle
|- 
! scope="row" |3
| rowspan="2"|Burkina Faso
| Camel Milk
|- 
! scope="row" |4
| Chicken
|- 
! scope="row" |5
| Lithuania
| Stilts
|-
! scope="row" |6
| Croatia
| Croatian Gun
|-
! scope="row" |7
| Italy
| BlackBerry
|-
! scope="row" |8
| India
| U-Turn Board
|-
! scope="row" |9
| Japan
| Janitor
|-
! scope="row" |10
| Taiwan
| Tea
|}
After completing the Roadblock, teams were told to travel to "Cook's Eye View of the Sleeping Lady", which referred to the Captain Cook Statue at Resolution Park. There, teams found their next clue. Teams then had to search on foot for the Salmon Hooker Statue at the Alaska Center for the Performing Arts, where they found their final clue directing them to the finish line at Girdwood Airport.

Elimination Station 
The first five teams eliminated were sequestered at a villa in Portugal to await the finale. Subsequently, eliminated teams telephoned to inform the teams at the villa of their elimination, but continued to run the race as decoys to throw off potential spoilers. The sequestered teams met up with the decoy teams in the final destination city to cheer on the final three teams as they crossed the Finish Line.

CBS posted short videos on its website after each episode aired in the Pacific Time Zone, which showed the eliminated teams interacting at the villa.
After Leg 1, Ari & Staella were the first team eliminated and sent to the villa, where they explored the house and contemplated their unfortunate first leg. They predicted one of the older teams would be eliminated next and that Lorena & Jason would win.
After Leg 2, Kate & Pat were the second team eliminated and sent to the villa. They discussed their opinions of the other racers with Ari and Staella. Ari was unhappy when Kate and Pat criticized his negative views, if not insults, of some of the racers.
After Leg 3, Marianna & Julia were the third team eliminated and sent to the villa. Once again, Ari grew irritated with Kate and Pat – this time because he felt that they were dominating the conversations with Marianna and Julia. At the end of the day, Ari, Staella, Marianna, and Julia all went out to party while Kate and Pat opted to stay behind, much to Ari's delight.
After Leg 4, Lorena & Jason were the fourth team eliminated and sent to the villa, and they were excited to finally relax. Everyone was shocked and disappointed to see that they had been eliminated. At the beach, Lorena, Jason, Ari, Staella, Marianna, and Julia went cliff-jumping with some Portuguese locals; Kate and Pat were asked to stay out of camera range so production could make it look like they went to a castle/museum alone. In fact, all teams went to the castle together.
After Leg 5, Shana & Jennifer were the fifth team eliminated and sent to the villa. They immediately apologized to Lorena & Jason for using the U-Turn, though Lorena and Jason were a little skeptical to their reasoning. Marianna & Julia made a beautiful burnt barbecue feast for the new arrival team and later Shana & Jennifer shared their thoughts about who would be eliminated next, saying it would be Nicolas & Donald.
After Leg 6, Azaria & Hendekea were the sixth team eliminated. They called the villa and shared news about the season with the other eliminated teams. All the teams were shocked when they found out Azaria & Hendekea were eliminated. Lorena & Jason got along with Shana & Jennifer in the villa while later on, all the sequestered teams went out to sea on a boat.
Leg 8 was a non-elimination leg. Meanwhile, the five sequestered teams enjoyed various outdoor activities such as rock climbing, hiking, zip-lining and mountain biking. Later, they were given a taste of local Portuguese food and culture.
After Leg 8, Kynt & Vyxsin were the seventh team eliminated. They called the villa, where teams were shocked at their elimination. As the Goths explained what went wrong in their Mumbai leg, they also expressed how well teams like Nicolas & Donald and Ronald & Christina were doing. Then, as the sequestered teams realized their time in the villa would soon end, everyone went out for a little poolside fun.
Leg 9 was a non-elimination leg. After one last staged visit to a Portuguese vineyard, the sequestered teams pack-up, and wonder what it will be like back home.
After Leg 10, Nathan & Jennifer were the eighth and final team to be eliminated. They called after the five sequestered teams arrived in Alaska, where the season would end. After the call, each team gave their opinion on who they wanted to see win.
Leg 11 was the final leg of The Amazing Race 12. Azaria & Hendekea, Kynt & Vyxsin, and Nathan & Jennifer reunited with the rest of the eliminated teams. Some of the eliminated teams shared their opinions on the winners and the runners-up. The final three admit to their final joys and disappointments.

Reception

Critical response
The Amazing Race 12 received positive reviews. Linda Holmes of Television Without Pity called it a good season. Heather Havrilesky of Salon was positive towards this season's cast writing "there are some pretty amusing teams this season". In 2016, this season was ranked 6th out of the first 27 seasons by the Rob Has a Podcast Amazing Race correspondents. In 2021, Jane Andrews of Gossip Cop ranked this season as the show's 9th best season. Val Barone of TheThings ranked this season as the show's 3rd best season.

Ratings
U.S. Nielsen ratings

Canadian ratings

References

External links
Official website

 12
2007 American television seasons
2008 American television seasons
Television shows filmed in Los Angeles
Television shows filmed in England
Television shows filmed in the Republic of Ireland
Television shows filmed in the Netherlands
Television shows filmed in France
Television shows filmed in Burkina Faso
Television shows filmed in Lithuania
Television shows filmed in the Czech Republic
Television shows filmed in Croatia
Television shows filmed in Italy
Television shows filmed in India
Television shows filmed in Japan
Television shows filmed in Taiwan
Television shows filmed in Alaska